"Jim Jones at Botany Bay" (Roud 5478) is a traditional Australian folk ballad dating from the early 19th-century. The narrator, Jim Jones, is found guilty of poaching and sentenced to transportation to the penal colony of New South Wales. En route, his ship is attacked by pirates, but the crew holds them off. When the narrator remarks that he would rather have joined the pirates or indeed drowned at sea than gone to Botany Bay, Jones is reminded by his captors that any mischief will be met with the whip. In the final verse, Jones describes the daily drudgery and degradation of life as a convict in Australia, and dreams of joining the bushrangers (escaped convicts turned outlaws) and taking revenge on his floggers.

Australian folklorists such as Bill Scott date the song's composition to the years immediately preceding 1830 when bushranger Jack Donahue, who is named in the song, was fatally shot by troopers. The oldest surviving written version of the ballad is found in Old Pioneering Days in the Sunny South (1907), a book of reminiscences by Charles McAlister, a pioneer who drove bullock teams in southern-eastern New South Wales in the 1840s. According to folklorist A. L. Lloyd, "Jim Jones at Botany Bay" may have been lost to history had McAlister not included it in his book.

McAlister said "Jim Jones at Botany Bay" was sung to the tune of "Irish Molly O". Others consider it likely that it was sung to the tune of the Irish rebel song "Skibbereen".

Lyrics

One version of the traditional lyrics is shown below.

Come gather round and listen lads, and hear me tell m' tale,
How across the sea from England I was condemned to sail.
The jury found me guilty, and then says the judge, says he,
Oh for life, Jim Jones, I'm sending you across the stormy sea.
But take a tip before you ship to join the iron gang,
Don't get too gay in Botany Bay, or else you'll surely hang.
"Or else you'll surely hang", he says, and after that, Jim Jones,
Way up high upon yon gallows tree, the crows will pick your bones.

There's no time for mischief there, remember that, they say
Oh they'll flog the poaching out of you down there in Botany Bay.
With the storms a-raging round us, and the winds a-blowing gales
I'd rather drowned in misery than gone to New South Wales.
Our ship was high upon the seas when pirates came along,
But the soldiers on our convict ship were full five hundred strong;
They opened fire and so they drove that pirate ship away
But I'd rather joined that pirate ship than gone to Botany Bay.

Day and night in irons clad we like poor galley slaves 
Will toil and toil our lives away to fill dishonored graves 
But by and by I'll slip m' chains and to the bush I'll go 
And I'll join the brave bushrangers there, Jack Donahue and Co.
And some dark night all is right and quiet in the town,
I'll get the bastards one and all, I'll gun the floggers down. 
I'll give them all a little treat, remember what I say 
And they'll yet regret they sent Jim Jones in chains to Botany Bay.

Recordings
 Ewan MacColl, "Jim Jones at Botany Bay" (on "Convicts and Currency Lads" 1957)
 Marian Henderson, "Jim Jones of Botany Bay" (PIX magazine EP, 1964)
 Gary Shearston, "Jim Jones at Botany Bay" (on "Folk Songs and Ballads of Australia" 1964)
 A. L. Lloyd, "Jim Jones at Botany Bay" (on "The Great Australian Legend" 1971)
 Bushwhackers and Bullockies Bush Band ("Bushwackers Band"), "Jim Jones at Botany Bay" (on "The Shearer's Dream", Picture Records 1974. Tune by Mick Slocum as recorded by Bob Dylan 1992; Martin Carthy 1999)
 Bob Dylan, "Jim Jones" (on Good as I Been to You, 1992)
 Martin Carthy, "Jim Jones in Botany Bay" (on Signs of Life, 1999)
 Mick Thomas and the Sure Thing, "Jim Jones at Botany Bay" (on Dead Set Certainty, 1999)
 Martyn Wyndham-Reed, "Jim Jones at Botany Bay" (on Undiscovered Australia, 19xx)
 The Currency, "Jim Jones" (on "888", 2008)
 Mawkin:Causley, "Botany Bay" (on Cold Ruin, 2008)
 Chloe and Jason Roweth, "Jim Jones at Botany Bay" (on Battler's Ballad, Live at Humph Hall, 2012)
 Jennifer Jason Leigh, "Jim Jones at Botany Bay" (on The Hateful Eight soundtrack, 2015)
 Bill and Joel Plaskett, "Jim Jones" (on Solidarity, 2017)

References in popular culture
 In the computer strategy game Sid Meier's Alien Crossfire, the last part of the ballad is used upon faction selection to describe the Free Drones, a labourer faction.
 In The Hateful Eight, Daisy Domergue (Jennifer Jason Leigh) sings the song in reference to her captivity, altering "And I'll join the brave bushrangers there, Jack Donahue and Co." to "And you'll be dead behind me John when I get to Mexico", specifically to goad her captor, bounty-hunter John Ruth (Kurt Russell). This performance is available on the film's soundtrack, The Hateful Eight. The Hateful Eight takes place during the Reconstruction Era, several decades after the song is thought to have been written but before it was published in 1907. It was sung to the tune of Skibbereen.

See also
"Botany Bay", another Australian convict ballad
"Wild Colonial Boy", ballad inspired by bushranger Jack Donahue

References

Bibliography
 Charles MacAlister, Old Pioneering Days in the Sunny South (1907), "Jim Jones at Botany Bay" (1 text)
 Geoffrey Grigson (editor), The Penguin Book of Ballads (1975), 96, "Jim Jones at Botany Bay" (1 text)
 Warren Fahey, Eureka: The Songs that Made Australia (1984), pp. 28–29, "Jim Jones at Botany Bay" (1 text, 1 tune)
 J. S. Manifold, The Penguin Australian Songbook (1964), pp. 12–13, "Jim Jones" (1 text, 1 tune)
 ST PBB096 (Partial)
 Roud Folksong #5478

Australian folk songs
Australian poems
Songs about Australia
Songs about criminals
Songs about crime
Songs about pirates
1907 songs
Bob Dylan songs
Folk ballads
Botany Bay